William Gregory was Chief Justice of the Province of Quebec from 1764 to 1766.

Little is known of Gregory beyond being a lawyer from London with a checkered past and legal issues. On February 17, 1764 Grergory was appointed to become Chief Justice of the King's Bench of the Province of Quebec along with George Suckling as Attorney General. Gregory's lack of legal expertise in French civil law would result in his term as Chief Justice ending in 1766 and subsequently replaced by William Hey.

References

Province of Quebec (1763–1791) judges